Gasoducto dekl Sur may refer to:

 Gasoducto del Sur a proposed gas pipeline in southern Puerto Rico
 Gran Gasoducto del Sur, a proposed gas pipeline from Venezuela to Argentina